Mimi Imfurst (born March 2, 1983), the stage name of Braden S. Chapman (or Braden S. Maurer-Burns), is an American drag performer. She appeared on the third season of RuPaul's Drag Race and RuPaul's Drag Race: All Stars and was a founding member of the girl group Xelle. In 2017, he became the first U.S. drag queen to perform in Cuba, lip-syncing to Madonna's "Express Yourself" with a group of local dancers.

Early life
Imfurst was born in Hanson, Massachusetts, and raised in Maine from an early age. In his teens, Imfurst was homeless after he was kicked out of his parents' home allegedly due to his sexuality. He later was adopted by a lesbian couple and started doing drag at the age of 16. Imfurst attended Marymount Manhattan College.

Career
Mimi Imfurst originally went by the drag name Delilah DeMistra, which was inspired by Hedy Lamarr's character in Samson and Delilah.

Mimi Imfurst is perhaps best known for his annual Christmas show where he portrays Jesus's mother Mary, for which he appears in Nick and Norah's Infinite Playlist. Despite this, Imfurst's role has been met with controversy. In 2005, the Catholic Advocacy Coalition named him one of the top 10 anti-Catholic people. One of his shows in Times Square was protested by over 600 people.

In 2010, Imfurst acted in several Off-Broadway plays, including Boylesque, a parody of the film Burlesque, which opened at the Laurie Beechman Theatre. She also acted in Mayo on Your Breakfast at Tiffany's at the Bowery Poetry Club and Thank You for Being a Friend, a parody of The Golden Girls. Imfurst starred in the title role in Rhoda Heartbreak.

Imfurst was featured in the web series Queens of Drag: NYC by gay.com in 2010. The series featured fellow New York drag queens Bianca Del Rio, Dallas DuBois, Hedda Lettuce, Lady Bunny, Peppermint, and Sherry Vine.

Mimi Imfurst auditioned three times before becoming a contestant on the third season of RuPaul's Drag Race. He placed high in the first two challenges but was eliminated in the episode "Totally Leotarded" after lifting fellow contestant India Ferrah over his head during their lip-sync. Imfurst was among 12 former contestants brought back for RuPaul's Drag Race: All Stars. He was partnered with Pandora Boxx to form Team Mandora, but was eliminated in the first episode. In the show's fifth season, Jinkx Monsoon impersonated Imfurst for the main challenge during the episode "Lip Synch Extravaganza Eleganza".

In 2011, Imfurst appeared in an Entertainment Weekly photo spread along with Pandora Boxx that featured Melissa McCarthy channeling Divine. Imfurst also appeared on the cover of Next with Carmen Carrera and Manila Luzon. The same year, Imfurst starred as Rodney in the Off-Broadway play My Big Gay Italian Wedding.

In December 2014, an animated version of Imfurst appeared in the RuPaul's Drag Race: Dragopolis 2.0 mobile app.

Mimi Imfurst has appeared on Celebrity Apprentice and The Howard Stern Show. Imfurst also performs as a stand-up comedian, having opened for Kathy Griffin and Mo'Nique.

In 2017, Mimi became the first American drag queen to perform in Cuba since the embargo.

In May 2018, Mimi engaged in ongoing unwanted sexual advances toward several young gay men in the Philadelphia scene that feared they would be blacklisted from the community if they did not comply. He admitted to these allegations.

Xelle
Xelle (stylized as XELLE, pronounced excel) is an American pop "girl group", originally consisting of members Mimi Imfurst, JC Cassis, and Rony G. The group first met in 2010 when Imfurst hosted a karaoke bash.

For Xelle's first music video "Party Girl," the group started a successful Kickstarter campaign, meeting their goal of $3,000. "Party Girl" was directed by Hilarion Banks and costumes were provided by Geoffrey Mac. "Invincible," Xelle's second single was released on February 14, 2012, with proceeds of the song going to GLSEN. "Invincible" features fan-submitted videos holding signs that deal with victimization and bullying issues.

Xelle's music video for "Queen", dedicated to the late Sahara Davenport, featured appearances by Imfurst's fellow RuPaul's Drag Race contestants Alexis Mateo, Jiggly Caliente, Jujubee, Manila Luzon, Pandora Boxx, Phi Phi O'Hara, Raven, Shannel, Tammie Brown, and Yara Sofia. Xelle has appeared on Big Ang and Jersey Couture.

Imfurst departed Xelle in July 2013, with an official statement released by the group on their web page August 1, 2013.

Discography
Extended plays
 Queens (2012)

Singles

Discography

Singles

Filmography

Film

Television

Web series

See also
 LGBT culture in New York City

References

External links

 
 

1983 births
Living people
American drag queens
American gay actors
American gay musicians
LGBT people from Massachusetts
Mimi Imfurst
Mimi Imfurst
20th-century American LGBT people
21st-century LGBT people